The Real Thing is the first album by American recording artist Bo Bice. It was released on December 13, 2005, through RCA Records and sold 227,000 copies in its first week, debuting at #4 on the Billboard 200 album chart. A DualDisc was also released, with a DVD side along with the CD side. The DVD included hidden tracks and a short film, A Day in the Life of Bo Bice.

Track listing

Personnel
Performance credits
Bo Bice - Electric Guitar, Background Vocals, Soloist
Cliff Magness - Acoustic Guitar, Percussion, Piano, Electric Bass, Electric Guitar, Keyboards, Hammond Organ
John Shanks - Bass, Guitar, Keyboards, Background Vocals
Mitch Allan - Bass, Guitar, Background Vocals
David Spidel - Bass
Richie Sambora - Guitar, Background Vocals, Soloist
Chad Kroeger - Guitar
Jamie Muhoberac - Piano
Joey Waronker - Drums
Ryan Brown - Drums
Steven Wolf - Drums
Jeff Rothschild - Drums
Daniel Adair - Drums
Marti Frederiksen - Background Vocals

Technical credits

Cliff Magness - Arranger, programming, producer, engineer, drum engineering
Clive Davis - Producer
Marti Frederiksen - Producer, engineer, instrumentation
John Shanks - Producer
Tom Keifer - Producer
Max Martin - Producer, instrumentation
Mitch Allan - 	Producer
Chad Kroeger - Producer
Lukasz "Dr. Luke" Gottwald - Producer, instrumentation
Ben Moody - Producer
Josh Wilbur - Engineer

Jeff Rothschild - Engineer
Brian Paturalski  - Engineer
Todd Tidwell  - Engineer
Lasse Mårtén - Engineer
Aaron Kasdorf - Engineer, vocal engineer, drum engineering
Jorge Vivo - Digital editing
Chris Gehringer - Mastering
Gavie Boulware - Management
Simon Renshaw - Management
Mikal Reid - Drum engineering

Charts and certifications

Release history

References

External links
 BN Music

19 Recordings albums
2005 debut albums
Albums produced by Clive Davis
Bo Bice albums
RCA Records albums